The 2016 Kaspersky Riga Masters was a professional ranking snooker tournament that took place between 22–24 June 2016 at the Arena Riga in Riga, Latvia. It was the first ranking event of the 2016/2017 season.

This was the first time for which the event was a ranking tournament, having previously been a minor-ranking event of the Players Tour Championship.

Barry Hawkins was the defending champion, but he decided not to defend his title.

Neil Robertson won the 12th ranking title of his career, defeating Michael Holt 5–2 in the final, from trailing 1–2.

Prize fund
The breakdown of prize money for this year is shown below:

 Winner: €50,000
 Runner-up: €25,000
 Semi-final: €15,000
 Quarter-final: €6,000
 Last 16: €3,000
 Last 32: €1,400
 Last 64: €700

 Non-televised highest break: €200
 Televised highest break: €2,000
 Total: €200,000

The "rolling 147 prize" for a maximum break stood at £25,000.

Main draw

Final

Qualifying
These matches were held between 3 and 4 June 2016 at the Preston Guild Hall in Preston, England. All matches were best of 7 frames.

Notes

Century breaks

Qualifying stage centuries
Total: 15

 135, 111  John Higgins
 131  Mark King
 124, 100  Stuart Carrington
 121  Anthony Hamilton
 111  Li Hang
 110, 108  Mark Williams

 110  John Astley
 110  Peter Ebdon
 108  Zhang Anda
 104  Mike Dunn
 103  Mark Selby
 101  Joe Perry

Televised stage centuries
Total: 31

 138  Martin O'Donnell
 135  Zhao Xintong
 134, 102  Jimmy Robertson
 132  Zhou Yuelong
 130  Ian Burns
 125  Mark Davis
 124  Gary Wilson
 123  Mark Williams
 118  Michael Holt
 117, 110, 107  John Astley
 115  Stuart Bingham
 112, 107  Anthony McGill

 108, 104, 100, 100  Neil Robertson
 108  Li Hang
 106  Stuart Carrington
 105, 100  Sean O'Sullivan
 105  Fergal O'Brien
 105  Jack Lisowski
 103  Yan Bingtao
 103  Judd Trump
 102  Xiao Guodong
 101  Jamie Cope
 100  Marco Fu

References

Riga Masters (snooker)
Riga Masters (snooker)
Riga Masters (snooker)
Riga Masters